Mathieu Mille (born January 10, 1981) is a French former professional ice hockey defenceman.

Mille played in the Ligue Magnus for Gothiques d'Amiens, Anglet Hormadi Élite, Scorpions de Mulhouse, Corsaires de Dunkerque, Ducs de Dijon and Pingouins de Morzine-Avoriaz.

Mille also played in the 2008 and 2009 IIHF World Championship for France.

References

External links

1981 births
Living people
Anglet Hormadi Élite players
Ducs de Dijon players
French ice hockey defencemen
Gothiques d'Amiens players
HC Morzine-Avoriaz players
Scorpions de Mulhouse players
Sportspeople from Amiens